

Ambassadors

List of Cuban Ambassadors to the United States

16 June 1902 - Legation Opened

 Gonzalo de Quesada
Title: Envoy Extraordinary and Minister Plenipotentiary
 Presented credentials: 16 June 1902
General Carlos Garcia Velez
Title: Envoy Extraordinary and Minister Plenipotentiary
Presented credentials: 9 April 1909
Dr. Francisco Carrera Justiz
Title: Envoy Extraordinary and Minister Plenipotentiary
Presented credentials: 8 April 1910
Mr. Antonio Martin-Rivero
Title: Envoy Extraordinary and Minister Plenipotentiary
Presented credentials: 11 April 1911
Dr. Pablo Desvernine
Title: Envoy Extraordinary and Minister Plenipotentiary
Presented credentials: 17 June 1913
Dr. Carlos Manuel de Cespedes y Quesada
Title: Envoy Extraordinary and Minister Plenipotentiary
Presented credentials: 22 July 1914

13 December 1923 - Legation raised to Embassy

 Cosme de la Torriente y Peraza
Title: Ambassador Extraordinary and Plenipotentiary
Presented credentials: 13 December 1923
 Rafael Sanchez-Aballi
Title: Ambassador Extraordinary and Plenipotentiary
Presented credentials: 3 December 1925
 Orestes Ferrara
Title: Ambassador Extraordinary and Plenipotentiary
Presented credentials: 21 December 1926
 Oscar B. Cintas
Title: Ambassador Extraordinary and Plenipotentiary
Presented credentials: 4 November 1932
 Dr. Jose T. Baron
Title: Chargé d'Affaires a.i.
Presented credentials: 10 August 1933
 Dr. Manuel Marquez Sterling
Title: Ambassador Extraordinary and Plenipotentiary
Presented credentials: 31 January 1934
 Dr. Jose T. Baron
Title: Chargé d'Affaires a.i.
Presented credentials: 10 December 1934
 Dr. Guillermo Patterson de Jauregui
Title: Ambassador Extraordinary and Plenipotentiary
Presented credentials: 6 February 1935
 Dr. Pedro Martinez Fraga
Title: Ambassador Extraordinary and Plenipotentiary
Presented credentials: 9 March 1937
 Dr. Jose T. Baron
Title: Chargé d'Affaires a.i.
Presented credentials: 10 December 1940
 Dr. Aurelio Fernandez Concheso
Title: Ambassador Extraordinary and Plenipotentiary
Presented credentials: 5 February 1941
 Dr. Guillermo Belt
Title: Ambassador Extraordinary and Plenipotentiary
Presented credentials: 20 December 1944
 Dr. Oscar Gans
Title: Ambassador Extraordinary and Plenipotentiary
Presented credentials: 12 April 1949
 Dr. Luis Machado
Title: Ambassador Extraordinary and Plenipotentiary
Presented credentials: 11 July 1950

10 March 1952 - Severed relations

27 March 1952 - Resumed relations

 Dr. Alberto Espinosa
Title: Chargé d'Affaires a.i.
Presented credentials: 27 March 1952
 Dr. Aurelio Fernandez Concheso
Title: Ambassador Extraordinary and Plenipotentiary
Presented credentials: 28 April 1952
 Dr. Miguel Ángel de la Campa y Caraveda
Title: Ambassador Extraordinary and Plenipotentiary
Presented credentials: 8 April 1955
 Nicolas Arroyo
Title: Ambassador Extraordinary and Plenipotentiary
Presented credentials: 9 April 1958
Dr. Ernesto Dihigo
Title: Ambassador Extraordinary and Plenipotentiary
Presented credentials: 25 February 1959

3 January 1961 - Severed relations

20 July 2015 - Resumed relations
José Ramón Cabañas Rodríguez
Title: Ambassador Extraordinary and Plenipotentiary
Presented credentials: 17 September 2015

See also

Embassy of Cuba in Washington, D.C.
Cuba-United States relations
United States Ambassadors to Cuba

References

 
United States
Cub